Zoe Shipperley (born 17 March 1990) is an English international field hockey player who played as a defender for England and Great Britain.

She plays club hockey in the Women's England Hockey League Premier Division for Buckingham.

Shipperley competed for England in the women's hockey tournament at the 2014 Commonwealth Games winning a silver medal.

References

External links

1990 births
Living people
Commonwealth Games silver medallists for England
English female field hockey players
Field hockey players at the 2014 Commonwealth Games
Commonwealth Games medallists in field hockey
Sportspeople from Oxford
Women's England Hockey League players
Team Bath Buccaneers Hockey Club players
Medallists at the 2014 Commonwealth Games